Lump of Sun is the debut novel of Bosnian writer Zaim Topčić. It was published by the Belgrade-based publishing house Rad on 24 November 1958. The story revolves around Ustasha concentration camps of World War II.
 
The novel received the Annual Award of the Association of Writers of Bosnia and Herzegovina for best book published in 1958.

It was preceded by the collections of short stories released in 1952 and 1955, respectively.

References

1958 novels
Fiction set in the 20th century
Bosnia and Herzegovina culture
Bosnia and Herzegovina literature
Historical novels
Novels set in Bosnia and Herzegovina
Novels set in Yugoslavia
1958 debut novels